Junior Chukwuemeka Ogedi-Uzokwe also known as Junior (born 3 March 1994) is an English professional footballer who plays as a forward, for NIFL Premiership side Glentoran.

Ogedi-Uzokwe was a member of the youth teams at Leyton Orient, Ilford and Millwall before making the step up to men's football. Ogedi-Uzokwe spent the 2013–14 season with Enfield 1893, Aveley and Hucknall Town, before joining Carlton Town in July 2014. In January 2015, he joined Hayes & Yeading United and marked his debut with a goal.

In the summer of 2015, Ogedi-Uzokwe joined Barkingside, before a move to Lewes in December 2015. He then spent 18 months with Türk Ocağı Limasol, where he won the Cypriot Cup. In July 2017, he joined Isthmian League North Division club Maldon & Tiptree – where he scored 34 goals in 34 games. His prolific scoring form earned him a contract with English Football League side Colchester United in January 2018. He signed for Bromley on loan in July 2018, and then Derry City on loan in February 2019. Following the completion of his loan with Derry, he made a permanent move to Israeli Premier League club Hapoel Hadera in February 2020. Due to the Israeli Premier League cancellation he then moved back to the League of Ireland Premier Division to join Sligo Rovers. He moved to Dundalk in February 2021, before returning to Derry City on loan in July 2021.

In January 2023 on the transfer deadline day he signed for NIFL Premiership club Glentoran.

Career

Early career 
Ogedi-Uzokwe was a member of the youth teams at two English Football League clubs, Leyton Orient and Millwall, separated by a spell at Ilford. He made the step up to men's football at Enfield 1893 at the age of 18. In late 2013, he signed for Aveley before moving to Nottingham and signing for Hucknall Town and Carlton Town. He returned south to play for Hayes & Yeading United, Barkingside and Lewes.

Türk Ocağı Limasol 
On 26 January 2016, Ogedi-Uzokwe joined Northern Cypriot club Türk Ocağı Limasol. He made his debut the following day in a 2–0 victory against Gençli̇k Gücü in the Cypriot Cup Second Round first leg. On 31 January, Ogedi-Uzokwe scored his first goal for the club in the 7–0 second leg victory. After going four games without a goal, he scored both goals in a 2–0 win at Yeni̇cami AK on 5 March. Ogedi-Uzokwe scored his first goal of the season two weeks later in a 3–1 win against Bostanci Bağcil.

In September 2016, Ogedi-Uzokwe returned to the club for a second season but went seven games without a goal. He eventually scored in a 1–0 win against Küçük Kaymakli on 13 November. His second goal came a month later when opening the scoring of a 2–0 win against Gençli̇k Gücü on 30 December. Following a further 14 goalless games for Ogedi-Uzokwe, mostly because he was playing as a midfielder, he scored three goals in April to seal league victories against Çetinkaya Türk and Ci̇hangi̇r.

Having appeared in every match of the 2016–17 league campaign, Ogedi-Uzokwe scored twice on the final day of the season in a 6–2 win against Gençli̇k Gücü. A week later, he played 89 minutes in a 1–0 victory against Yalova in the Cypriot Cup Final to celebrate his first piece of silverware with the club.

Maldon & Tiptree 
In July 2017, Ogedi-Uzokwe joined Isthmian League North Division club Maldon & Tiptree upon his return to England. He made his debut in a 1–0 win at Ware on 12 August, and scored his first and second goals for the club a week later in a 5–1 win against Waltham Abbey on his home debut. In September 2017, Ogedi-Uzokwe scored 10 goals in just eight games, including a hat-trick in a 4–2 win against Tilbury. The following month, he scored eight goals in seven games. During his goalscoring run, he scored in nine consecutive games from 23 September to 28 October, and scored in 15 consecutive league games between 9 September and 2 December.

On 25 November, he scored his second hat-trick of the season in a 5–1 win versus Dereham Town. On 1 January 2018, Ogedi-Uzokwe marked his final appearance for the club with a 90th-minute winner against Witham Town. He scored both goals in the 2–1 victory. He left the club having scored 34 goals in 34 games in all competitions.

Colchester United 
On 3 January 2018, Ogedi-Uzokwe joined League Two club Colchester United alongside Maldon & Tiptree teammate Ryan Gondoh. He signed an 18-month deal. He made his professional debut for Colchester on 20 January 2018 as an injury time substitute in their 1–1 draw with Grimsby Town. He then scored his first professional goal on his first start for the club from the penalty spot, before turning provider for Mikael Mandron in Colchester's 2–1 win against Coventry City on 13 February. After nine appearances in the 2017–18 season, he vowed to return stronger for Colchester after a full pre-season with the club.

Bromley loan 
On 27 July 2018, National League side Bromley signed Ogedi-Uzokwe on loan until January 2019. He made his Bromley debut as a second-half substitute in their 2–1 defeat at AFC Fylde on 4 August. He scored his first goal for the club with an 88th-minute winner in a 1–0 win over Gateshead on 18 August.

Derry City loan 
On 7 February 2019, Ogedi-Uzokwe joined League of Ireland Premier Division side Derry City on loan until 30 June. He made his debut on 15 February in Derry's 3–0 win against UCD. He scored his first goal for the club in a 3–0 win in the League of Ireland Cup against Longford Town on 2 April. His loan was extended to the end of the League of Ireland season after an automatic one-year contract extension was activated by Colchester. Junior finished the season with 16 goals and 11 assists in all competition. Finishing as the league's top scorer with 14 goals and helping Derry to secure UEFA Europa League for the following season.

Hapoel Hadera 
On 5 February, Colchester United announced the departure of Ogedi-Uzokwe to Israeli Premier League side Hapoel Hadera on a permanent contract. He made his debut for the club the same day, starting in a 1–0 win against Bnei Yehuda.

Sligo Rovers 
On 24 July 2020 Junior Ogedi-Uzokwe signed for Irish club Sligo Rovers. Junior scored his first goal for the club in a 3-1 victory over Dundalk FC. Ogedi-Uzokwe's second goal for Sligo Rovers came two months later, in a 2-1 victory over Cork City. This result all but confirmed City's relegation from the Premier Division. In his 15 appearances and 2 goals in all competitions, Ogedi-Uzokwe helped Sligo to secure a 4th place finish and UEFA Europa Conference League football for the 2021 season.

Dundalk 
On 24 February 2021, Ogedi-Uzokwe signed for his third League of Ireland Premier Division club, Dundalk ahead of their 2021 season. His competitive debut for the club saw him earn a winners medal as his side won the 2021 President's Cup by beating Shamrock Rovers on penalties after a 1–1 draw at Tallaght Stadium on 12 March 2021. Ogedi-Uzokwe's first goal for the club came on 17 April 2021 when he scored an 85th minutes equalizer against league leaders St Patrick's Athletic at Oriel Park.

Derry City loan 
Ogedi-Uzokwe returned to Derry City on loan for the second time in his career on 1 July 2021 until the end of the season. He scored his first goal since his return to the club on 16 July 2021 in a 4–2 loss to Shamrock Rovers at the Ryan McBride Brandywell Stadium. Ogedi-Uzokwe scored 6 goals in 15 appearances during his loan spell, helping Derry to a 4th place finish, 2 places above his parent club Dundalk.

Bohemians 
Ogedi-Uzokwe signed a multi-year contract with Bohemians ahead of the 2022 season.

Career statistics

Honours

Club
Türk Ocağı Limasol
Cypriot Cup: 2017

Dundalk
President's Cup: 2021

Individual
League of Ireland Premier Division top scorer: 2019

References

External links

1994 births
Living people
English footballers
Association football forwards
Leyton Orient F.C. players
Ilford F.C. players
Millwall F.C. players
Hucknall Town F.C. players
Enfield 1893 F.C. players
Aveley F.C. players
Carlton Town F.C. players
Barkingside F.C. players
Gedling Miners Welfare F.C. players
Hayes & Yeading United F.C. players
Lewes F.C. players
Maldon & Tiptree F.C. players
Colchester United F.C. players
Bromley F.C. players
Derry City F.C. players
Hapoel Hadera F.C. players
Sligo Rovers F.C. players
Dundalk F.C. players
Bohemian F.C. players
Isthmian League players
East Midlands Counties Football League players
National League (English football) players
League of Ireland players
English Football League players
Israeli Premier League players
English expatriate footballers
Expatriate footballers in Northern Cyprus
Expatriate footballers in Israel
Nigerian expatriate sportspeople in Israel
English people of Nigerian descent
English expatriate sportspeople in Northern Cyprus
Black British sportspeople
Expatriate association footballers in the Republic of Ireland
Essex Senior Football League players